Constance Slaughter-Harvey (born 1946) is a Forest, Mississippi native that became the first black female judge in the state of Mississippi.

Education
Slaughter-Harvey studied at Hawkins High School where she graduated valedictorian in 1963. She received her bachelor's degree in political science and economics from Tougaloo College with cum laude honors. She met civil rights activist Medgar Evers while she was in college and his assassination in 1963 influenced Slaughter-Harvey to pursue a Juris Doctor degree. After graduation, she enrolled at the University of Mississippi School of Law where she was the first African-American female to graduate in 1970.

Career 
At the age of 24, Slaughter-Harvey was instrumental in integrating the ranks of the Mississippi State Highway Patrol, which led to the integration of HP's across the nation.

After receiving her law degree in 1970, the honorable Constance Slaughter-Harvey sued the state of Mississippi for racial discrimination. In response, Mississippi added the first three black state troopers to their ranks. Walter Crosby, Lewis Younger and R. O. Williams became the first African-Americans to wear what was then the Mississippi Highway Safety patrol uniform. Constance noted that the Mississippi Highway Patrol was the strong arm of the law for the Ku Klux Klan. She used her law degree to push to get that changed.  Her efforts in Mississippi opened the door for black men to serve as state troopers all across the US.

Indicative of her life’s dedication to serving others and forcing positive change, Slaughter-Harvey was so involved in the Highway Patrol lawsuit that she missed her own law school graduation ceremony.

Slaughter-Harvey was picked to serve as Scott County Court Judge in 1976 in a case involving a party previously represented byJudge Guyton Idom. This appointment made her the first female black judge in the state of Mississippi. She also served as a member of the Governor's Minority Advisory Committee and a Presidential Scholars Commissioner during the administration of President Jimmy Carter.

See also
List of first women lawyers and judges in Mississippi

References

1946 births
Living people
Tougaloo College alumni
University of Mississippi School of Law alumni
African-American judges
Mississippi state court judges
Mississippi articles needing attention
21st-century African-American people
20th-century African-American people